Nordic Radio Amateur Union is a Regional Radio Amateur Alliance. It was founded in 1935 by the Radio Amateur Societies of the Nordic countries.

References

See also 
International Amateur Radio Union
Finnish Amateur Radio League
Norwegian Radio Relay League
Swedish Society of Radio Amateurs
Icelandic Radio Amateurs
Faroese Amateur Radio Association
Danish Amateur Radio Experimenters

Amateur radio organizations
Scandinavia